1857 earthquake may refer to:

1857 Basilicata earthquake (Italy)
1857 Fort Tejon earthquake (California, US)
1857 Parkfield earthquake, see collective article Parkfield earthquake (California, US)

See also
List of historical earthquakes